János Juszkó (9 June 1939 – 2 May 2018) was a Hungarian cyclist. Juszko was born in Budapest, his profession was a Toolmaker. He competed at the 1964 Summer Olympics in the individual road race and the 100 km team time trial and finished in 24th and 12th place, respectively. 

He took part in eight Peace Races and won one stage in 1966. In 1964 and 1965 he was chosen Hungarian road cyclist of the year. He retired in 1973 and later worked as a cycling coach and a teacher of physical education.

References

1939 births
2018 deaths
Cyclists at the 1964 Summer Olympics
Olympic cyclists of Hungary
Hungarian male cyclists
Sportspeople from Szeged